Pete Gonzalez (born July 4, 1974) is a former professional American football quarterback. He played collegiately for the Pittsburgh Panthers.

College career
Gonzalez was the starting quarterback for the University of Pittsburgh football team in 1997. In that year, he led the Panthers to a come-from-behind-victory over the West Virginia Mountaineers in the Backyard Brawl 41–38 in double overtime. (It was the first season  of the current overtime rules in college football, which was designed to eliminate tied games.) He subsequently took Pitt to their first bowl game in eight years with an appearance in the Liberty Bowl.

NFL career
Gonzalez signed with the Pittsburgh Steelers as an undrafted free agent in 1998. He spent two seasons with the Steelers, both years as the third-string quarterback, throwing just one pass that was complete for eight yards to Hines Ward.  The one pass came in the 1999 season opener against the Cleveland Browns (the Browns' first game in four years), in which the Steelers won 43–0 and had put Gonzalez in late in the game after the outcome had been decided.

After the Steelers chose not to re-sign him—starting quarterback Kordell Stewart was the only quarterback carryover for the 2000 season from 1999, a year they had four quarterbacks on the roster the entire season (Stewart, Mike Tomczak, Gonzalez, and Anthony Wright)—Gonzalez signed with the Indianapolis Colts, but was cut in training camp and never returned to football as a player.

Gonzalez was the last Steelers player to wear number 7 before Ben Roethlisberger arrived in 2004.

After his NFL career, Gonzalez played two seasons in the Canadian Football League with the Hamilton Tiger-Cats. He was the backup to Danny McManus in 2002 and 2003. He went 67/150 for 999 yards, with four passing Touchdowns and seven interceptions.

Personal
Gonzalez and his wife Mandy have two children and live in the Pittsburgh area. He works outside of football, but does small consulting and training camps for junior high and high school quarterbacks and receivers in the Pittsburgh area.

References

1974 births
American people of Cuban descent
Living people
Players of American football from Miami
Players of Canadian football from Miami
American football quarterbacks
Canadian football quarterbacks
Pittsburgh Panthers football players
Pittsburgh Steelers players
Hamilton Tiger-Cats players